Simcha Felder (born December 30, 1958) is an American politician from Borough Park, Brooklyn. He represents the 17th district of the New York State Senate. Felder has been elected to multiple offices as a Democrat, but is known for having caucused with the Republicans during the early part of his New York State Senate tenure. Prior to serving in the State Senate, Felder represented the 44th district in the New York City Council.

Career
Early in his career, Felder served as chief of staff to Democratic New York State Assembly member Dov Hikind.

New York City Council
Felder was elected to the New York City Council in District 44 in 2001. He was re-elected in 2005 and 2009.
 
During his tenure on the City Council, Felder gained popularity among his conservative Jewish constituents for advocating strongly on their behalf and for supporting Israel. Although personally opposed to homosexuality as being against Orthodox Judaism, he backed Christine Quinn for City Council Speaker in what was seen as a political move to gain allies. Although Felder claimed to support Quinn, he said he could not actually vote for her because of religious reasons. When the time came to vote Quinn for Council Speaker, Felder did not cast a vote and took a trip to the restroom. Unlike nearly all other New York Democrats, Felder is a staunch opponent of abortion.

Felder backed city funding for religious schools, while maintaining that he opposes displays of religion in public schools. Felder has also gained attention by calling for better labeling of caffeine content in foods and beverages, as well as a ban on the distribution of unsolicited fliers. Felder is perhaps best known for his attempt to ban the feeding of pigeons in New York City.

In 2005, Felder crossed party lines to endorse then-Republican Mike Bloomberg in his bid for reelection as New York City mayor. Felder
asserted that Bloomberg was the only Republican he had ever voted for and implied that Bloomberg would be the only Republican he would ever support.

Felder was Chair of the Council's Subcommittee on Landmarks, Public Siting, and Maritime uses in his first term. In January 2006, he became Chair of the Committee on Governmental Operations. As Chair of Governmental Operations, Felder supported Mayor Bloomberg's plan to curb Pay to Play contracting practices and the Mayor's bid to extend term limits so the Mayor could run for a third term.

The committee also provided oversight of the City Board of Elections' implementation of the Help America Vote Act and enacted legislation to transfer the Environmental Control Board from the Department of Environmental Protection to the Office of Administrative Trials and Hearings. The Committee also enacted legislation to extend term limits from two terms to three. As a member of the Council's Land Use Committee, Felder was part of a group of New York state legislators that has consistently blocked plans to renovate United Nations headquarters, calling the UN anti-American and anti-Israel. In spite of such calls, the UN recently announced that it will undergo a $1 billion makeover.

In April 2006, Felder accused the highest-ranking uniformed member of the NYPD, Chief Joseph Esposito, of using inappropriate language when Esposito attempted to quell individuals who entered a police station house during a riot in Borough Park. Felder indicated that he personally heard the chief say, "Get the fucking Jews out of here." The Civilian Complaint Review Board, which investigates police misconduct, later found the accusation against Esposito unsubstantiated, but did reprimand Chief Esposito for using profanity. When subsequently asked to comment on the Review Board's finding, Felder's office stated that Felder had "no comment" about the incident and that he "wants to put the matter behind him".

Felder announced his Democratic presidential primary election vote for Senator Barack Obama "in protest" for what he felt was bad behavior by the campaign of New York Senator Hillary Rodham Clinton, following comments made by former president Bill Clinton regarding the South Carolina primary.

Comptroller's office
Felder served under New York City Comptroller John Liu as Deputy Comptroller for Budget and Accounting from 2010 through 2012.

New York State Senate

In 2008, Felder challenged incumbent State Senator Kevin Parker in a Democratic primary in Senate District 21. Parker won the primary with less than 50% of the vote.

Felder was elected to the New York State Senate in District 17 in November 2012. The district had been reconfigured as a "Super Jewish" district; reportedly, the Republican-controlled chamber drew the district specifically with Felder in mind. Even though incumbent David Storobin had won the seat in a special election, the GOP offered little support to him, and Felder handily defeated him.

Following the election to the Senate, Felder announced that despite being elected as a Democrat, he intended to caucus with the Republicans. That decision, along with Felder's stated willingness to return to the Senate Democratic Conference if doing so would benefit his district, had attracted attention and speculation during his Senate tenure. Brooklyn Democratic Party Chairman Frank Seddio called Felder's defection a "disgrace and a complete betrayal of his constituents."

As a State Senator, Felder was the only Democrat to vote against the $15 minimum wage; he cast deciding votes against the immigration-friendly New York Dream Act, killing it; he stated that ending stop-and-frisk was a mistake; he torpedoed the 5-cent plastic bag fees, thus winning himself the 2016 "Oil Slick Award" from an environmental advocacy group; and he supported pro-Israel policies like anti-BDS laws and Iran divestment. On the final day of the 2013 legislative session, Felder voted against a hostile amendment that would have attached a pro-choice bill to an unrelated piece of legislation.

Felder was reelected to the Senate without opposition in 2014 and 2016. In the latter election, he ran on the Democratic, Republican, and Conservative lines.

In April 2018, other lawmakers accused Felder of "essentially holding the $168 billion budget hostage until the state agreed not to interfere with the curriculum at the private Jewish schools known as yeshivas."

After an April 2018 agreement returned the Independent Democratic Conference (a breakaway faction of Democrats) to the mainline Democratic conference, Felder became the swing vote in the State Senate; this placed a spotlight on his continued affiliation with Senate Republicans. On April 24, 2018, Felder announced that he intended to continue caucusing with Senate Republicans during the remaining weeks of the 2018 legislative session; Felder made this statement despite the possibility that two special elections being held that day could give the Democratic Party a numerical majority in the State Senate, and despite Governor Andrew Cuomo's public support for Democratic control of the Senate. On April 25, Cuomo sent Felder an open letter to pressure him to rejoin the Senate Democratic Conference. Felder continued to caucus with the Republicans.

According to a May 2018 article in the Times Union, Brooklyn insiders believed that Felder would not be swayed by pressure, and that the Democratic establishment did not understand the "transactional" approach most of Felder's Orthodox Jewish constituents take to politics. Several people familiar with the district's dynamics told the Times-Union that most of Felder's constituents wear their party registration very loosely. According to one of them, Jacob Kornbluh of Jewish Insider, the area's voters mostly register as Democrats in order to have a say in local elections, but prefer Republicans at the state level. On paper, Felder's district is one of the more conservative districts in New York City. Donald Trump carried it with 52.8 percent of the vote in 2016, and Mitt Romney carried it with 58.3 percent in 2012. In both cases, only the Staten Island-based 24th district gave a higher vote percentage to a Republican presidential candidate.

In June 2018, Democratic State Committee members approved an informal resolution recommending Felder's ouster from the party. Former state Democratic Chairman Jay Jacobs, speaking to reporters afterward, reiterated their exasperation with Felder: 

In the 2018 Democratic primary in September 2018, Felder defeated Blake Morris, a lawyer. Morris was endorsed by Brooklyn Progressive Action Network, the labor union SEIU 32BJ, and the progressive group Our Revolution. Felder won re-election on November 6, 2018.

The 2018 elections saw the Democrats win control of the State Senate for only the second time since World War II. Felder sought to rejoin the Senate Democratic Conference. However, on December 31, 2018, the Senate Democratic Conference announced that Felder would not be allowed to rejoin its ranks. Even without Felder, the Democrats had 39 Senate seats, seven more than the 32 needed for a majority. On January 9, 2019, the Daily News reported that Felder had decided against caucusing with the Republicans, and was looking forward to rejoining the Senate Democrats "'at the appropriate time'". Felder was accepted into the Democratic caucus July 1, 2019 after having voted with the Democrats on multiple major pieces of legislation.

Personal life
Felder's father was Rabbi Harry Felder, spiritual leader of Beth Aaron Congregation in Borough Park.

References

External links
 New York State Senate Site Simcha Felder
 SimchaFelder.org Simcha Felder Campaign Site
 Felder2009.org Another Simcha Felder Campaign Site
 Simcha Felder for New York State Senate Facebook Group
 Ballotpedia: Simcha Felder

Living people
People from Borough Park, Brooklyn
New York City Council members
American Orthodox Jews
Jewish American state legislators in New York (state)
21st-century American politicians
Democratic Party New York (state) state senators
1958 births
21st-century American Jews